Sushil Kumar Saxena is an Indian musicologist, academic, scholar and the author of several books on music, philosophy and aesthetics. He is a former member of the faculty of the University of Delhi and has served the University Court as a member. His works include Studies in the Metaphysics of Bradley, Hindustan Music and Aesthetics Today, Art and Philosophy: Seven Aestheticians, Croce, Dewey, Collingwood, Santayana, Ducasse Langer, Reid, and Swinging Syllables Aesthetics of Kathak Dance and his lectures have been included in a book, Indian Music: Eminent Thinkers on Core Issues ; Discourses by Premlata Sharma, S. K. Saxena and Kapila Vatsyayan. He is a recipient of the Sangeet Natak Akademi Fellowship which he received in 2007. The Government of India awarded him the third highest civilian honour of the Padma Bhushan, in 2008, for his contributions to Indian music.

Selected bibliography

See also 
 Sangeet Natak Akademi Fellowship
 Kapila Vatsyayan

References

External links 
 
 

Recipients of the Padma Bhushan in arts
Year of birth missing (living people)
Scholars from Delhi
Indian musicologists
20th-century Indian philosophers
21st-century Indian philosophers
Academic staff of Delhi University
Recipients of the Sangeet Natak Akademi Fellowship
Living people
Recipients of the Sangeet Natak Akademi Award